Air Marshal Ian David Gale,  is a senior officer in the Royal Air Force. He is currently serving as Director-General of Joint Force Development, Strategic Command.

Early life and education
Gale was educated at Sir Thomas Picton School, a comprehensive school in Haverfordwest, Pembrokeshire, Wales. He joined the Royal Air Force (RAF) after finishing school. He studied for a Master of Arts degree in defence studies and international relations at King's College London, graduating in 2006. He studied for a Master of Business Administration with the Open University, graduating in 2012.

RAF career
Gale joined the RAF in 1989. After attending the Royal Air Force College Cranwell, he was commissioned as an acting pilot officer on 26 September 1989. He served as a fast jet pilot and weapons instructor from 1989 to 2005 and, in the 2004 Queen's Birthday Honours, was appointed a Member of the Order of the British Empire.

Gale became officer commanding No. 31 Squadron in 2008, and station commander at RAF Lossiemouth in 2011. After obtaining operational experience as Deputy Air Component Commander for Operation Ellamy, he became Assistant Chief of Staff for command, control, intelligence, surveillance and reconnaissance programmes in 2015. 

In April 2019, he was promoted to air vice-marshal and became Assistant Chief of the Air Staff. In April 2021, he was promoted to air marshal and appointed Director-General of Joint Force Development, Strategic Command. On 17 May 2021, Air Vice-Marshal Simon Edwards replaced him as Assistant Chief of the Air Staff following his appointment as Director-General of Joint Force Development.

References

|-

|-

Year of birth missing (living people)
Living people
Alumni of the Open University
Alumni of King's College London
Members of the Order of the British Empire
Royal Air Force officers
Royal Air Force air marshals
20th-century Royal Air Force personnel
21st-century Royal Air Force personnel
Royal Air Force personnel of the War in Afghanistan (2001–2021)